Orient Lines was a cruise line specialising in exotic destinations that was in operation 1993–2008. The brand was founded in 1993 by Gerry Herrod, and was sold to Norwegian Cruise Line in 1998. It ceased operations in March 2008 and was sold to new owners in June 2008. Operations were planned to be restarted in April 2009; however, due to the Great Recession of 2008, the re-launch of the Orient Lines brand was put on hold and eventually cancelled.

History
The history of Orient Lines began in 1991 when Shipping & General Ltd, owned by Gerry Herrod, acquired the cruise ship Alexandr Pushkin from Far Eastern Shipping Company. During the next two and a half years the Alexandr Pushkin was almost entirely rebuilt and emerged in 1993 as the Marco Polo for the new Orient Lines brand, embarking on a varied program with cruises all around the world.

In 1998, Norwegian Cruise Line (NCL) acquired the brand. In 1999, NCL itself was acquired by Star Cruises. Following this, NCL's Norwegian Crown joined the Orient Lines fleet in May 2000 under the name Crown Odyssey. In March 2001 Star Cruises announced that their SuperStar Aries would be joining the Orient Lines fleet in mid-2002 as the Ocean Voyager. This plan was shelved however, and in 2003, the Crown Odyssey returned to the NCL fleet and Orient Lines reverted to operating with just one ship.

On 4 June 2007, the Marco Polo was sold to the Greece-based Global Maritime, with a delivery date on 31 March 2008. Without its only ship sold and no other ships to replace it, the Orient Line brand ceased to operate.

On 27 June 2008, Star Cruises sold the Orient Line brand to Origin Cruise Group, owned by Wayne Heller. The new owners stated they would be restarting operations with several second-hand ships with a capacity of 600 to 800 passengers. The Maxim Gorkiy was due to enter service with Orient Lines in April 2009 as SS Marco Polo II. On 19 November 2008 Wayne Heller stated that due to the Great Recession of 2008, the relaunch of the Orient Lines brand was delayed indefinitely. The Maxim Gorkiy never was refitted and renamed Marco Polo II. The ship was sold for scrap in January 2009. No further announcements have been made regarding the future of the Orient Lines, though the trademarks are still owned by Origin Cruise Group. In 2019, the abandoned website was taken down due to the domain expiring.

Former Ships

References

External links
 Archived official website

Transport companies established in 1991
Transport companies disestablished in 2008
Defunct cruise lines
Norwegian Cruise Line
2008 disestablishments in Norway
Norwegian companies established in 1991